General Council elections were held in Senegal in December 1946. The Socialist Republican Union won all 50 seats.

Electoral system
Unlike other French colonies in Africa which used a dual college system, with French citizens electing part of the General Council and Africans electing the remainder, the Senegalese General Council was elected on a general roll.

Results

References

Elections in Senegal
Senegal
1946 in Senegal
Election and referendum articles with incomplete results